The 1988 United States presidential election in Tennessee took place on November 8, 1988. All 50 states and the District of Columbia were part of the 1988 United States presidential election. Tennessee voters chose 11 electors to the Electoral College, which selected the president and vice president. Tennessee was won by incumbent United States Vice President George H. W. Bush of Texas, who was running against Massachusetts Governor Michael Dukakis. Bush ran with Indiana Senator Dan Quayle as Vice President, and Dukakis ran with Texas Senator Lloyd Bentsen.

Tennessee weighed in for this election as eight points more Republican than the national average. Tennessee was the only state to vote more Republican than in 1984. , this was the last time the Republican candidate carried Davidson County (home of Nashville) and Shelby County (home of Memphis), both of which have become staunch, and in fact the only, Democratic strongholds into the 21st century. Also, this is the most recent election in which Tennessee voted more Republican than neighboring Kentucky.

The presidential election of 1988 was a very partisan election for Tennessee, with more than 99% of the electorate voting for either the Democratic or Republican parties, although ten candidates did appear on the ballot. Most counties in Tennessee turned out for Bush, including the highly populated Shelby County and Davidson County, by narrow margins. Those two counties have never voted Republican since this election. 

Tennessee was the only state that Bush improved on Ronald Reagan’s 1984 vote share, although only by 0.07%. He became only the second Republican after Richard Nixon in 1972 to carry Lincoln County and Hardeman County, which were two of only seven counties in the nation to switch from Walter Mondale to Bush.

Bush won the election in Tennessee with a 16-point landslide. The election results in Tennessee are reflective of a nationwide reconsolidation of base for the Republican Party, which took place through the 1980s. Through the passage of some very controversial economic programs, spearheaded by then President Ronald Reagan (called, collectively, "Reaganomics"), the mid-to-late 1980s saw a period of economic growth and stability. The hallmark for Reaganomics was, in part, the wide-scale deregulation of corporate interests, and tax cuts (most beneficial to the wealthy).

Dukakis ran his campaign on a socially liberal platform, and advocated for higher economic regulation and environmental protection. Bush, alternatively, ran on a campaign of continuing the social and economic policies of former President Reagan - which gained him much support with social conservatives and people living in rural areas. Additionally, while the economic programs passed under Reagan, and furthered under both Bushes, may have boosted the economy for a brief period, they are criticized by a number analysts as "setting the stage" for economic troubles in the United States after 2007, such as the Great Recession.

Results

Results by county

See also
 Presidency of George H. W. Bush

Notes

References

Tennessee
1988
1988 Tennessee elections